Radio Sole, formerly known as Radio Daisy International, is an independent local radio station based in Galatina (Lecce), Southern Italy.

History
It is one of the oldest independent radio stations in Italy since it opened in 1975, soon after it became legal to broadcast for private stations in Italy. The most famous speaker is Giuseppe Levanto.

The station has maintained its music policy mainly characterised by Italian pop music and news.

The station broadcasts on one frequency in the area of Galatina, 100.4 FM, and it is also available through live web streaming.

External links
 Radio Sole official website

Radio stations in Italy